The history of relations between France and Japan goes back to the early 17th century, when a Japanese samurai and ambassador on his way to Rome landed for a few days in Saint-Tropez and created a sensation. France and Japan have enjoyed a very robust and progressive relationship spanning centuries through various contacts in each other's countries by senior representatives, strategic efforts, and cultural exchanges.

After nearly two centuries of seclusion by "Sakoku" in Japan, the two countries became very important partners from the second half of the 19th century in the military, economic, legal and artistic fields. The Tokugawa shogunate (Bakufu) modernized its army through the assistance of French military missions (Jules Brunet), and Japan later relied on France for several aspects of its modernization, particularly the development of a shipbuilding industry during the early years of the Imperial Japanese Navy (Léonce Verny, Émile Bertin), and the development of a Legal code.

France derived part of its modern artistic inspiration from Japanese art, essentially through Japonism and its influence on Impressionism, and almost completely relied on Japan for its prosperous silk industry.

Country comparison

Chronology of Franco-Japanese relations

17th–18th centuries

 1615: Hasekura Tsunenaga, a Japanese samurai and ambassador who arrived at Coria del Rio, Spain, sent to Rome by Date Masamune, lands at Saint-Tropez for a few days, initiating the first contacts between France and Japan.
 1619: François Caron, son of French Huguenot refugees to the Netherlands enters the Dutch East India Company, and becomes the first person of French origin to set foot in Japan in 1619. He stays in Japan for 20 years, where he becomes a Director for the company. He later became the founding Director General of the French East India Company in 1664.
 1636: Guillaume Courtet, a French Dominican priest, sets foot in Japan. He penetrates into Japan in clandestinity, against the 1613 interdiction of Christianity. He is caught, tortured, and dies in Nagasaki on September 29, 1637.
 No French people visit Japan between 1640 and 1780.
 Around 1700, the impostor known as George Psalmanazar claims to come from the Japanese tributary island of Formosa.
 1787: La Pérouse (1741–1788) navigates in Japanese waters in 1787. He visits the Ryukyu Islands, and the strait between Hokkaidō and Sakhalin, giving it his name.

19th century

 1808: The French language is taught to five Japanese translators by the Dutch chief of Dejima, Hendrik Doeff.
 1844: A French naval expedition under Captain Fornier-Duplan onboard Alcmène visits Okinawa on April 28, 1844. Trade is denied, but Father Forcade is left behind with a translator.

 1846: Admiral Jean-Baptiste Cécille arrives in Nagasaki, but is denied landing.
 1855: In an effort to find the Russian fleet in the Pacific Ocean during the Crimean War, a French-British naval force reaches the port of Hakodate, open to British ships as a result of the Anglo-Japanese Friendship Treaty of 1854, and sails further North, seizing the Russian-American Company's possessions on the island of Urup in the Kuril archipelago. The Treaty of Paris (1856) restitutes the island to Russia.
 1855: Following the opening of Japan by the American Commodore Perry, France obtains a treaty with Okinawa on November 24, 1855.
 1858: The Treaty of Amity and Commerce between France and Japan is signed in Edo on October 9, 1858, by Jean-Baptiste Louis Gros, opening diplomatic relations between the two countries.
 1859: Arrival of Gustave Duchesne de Bellecourt.
 1862: Shōgun Tokugawa Iemochi sends First Japanese Embassy to Europe, led by Takenouchi Yasunori.
 1863: Second Japanese Embassy to Europe

 1864: Arrival of Leon Roches in Japan.
 1864: Bombardment of Shimonoseki by allied ships (9 British, 3 French, 4 Dutch, 1 American).
 1864: In November Leonce Verny arrives in Japan for the construction of the Yokosuka Naval Arsenal.
 1865: Shibata Takenaka visits France to prepare for the construction of the Yokosuka arsenal and organize a French military mission to Japan.
 1865: On September 12, 1865, the Messageries Maritimes passenger liner ship Dupleix was the first to call at a Japanese port to start a new service with France, both for passengers as well as for cargoes such as Japanese silk.

 1867: The first French Military Mission to Japan arrives in Yokohama January 13, 1867. Among them is Captain Jules Brunet.
 1867: Japan sends a delegation to the 1867 World Fair in Paris.
 1867: The French mining engineer Jean Francisque Coignet is sent to Satsuma Domain and is put in charge of the silver mines of Ikuno in 1868.
 1868: Kobe incident (February 4). A fight erupts in Kobe between 450 samurai of Okayama Domain and French sailors, leading to the occupation of central Kobe by foreign troops.
 1868: Eleven French sailors from the Dupleix are killed in the Sakai incident, in Sakai, near Osaka, by southern rebel forces.
 1869: Former French advisors under Jules Brunet fight alongside the last Tokugawa shogunate loyalists of Enomoto Takeaki, against Imperial troops in the Battle of Hakodate.
 1870: Henri Pelegrin directs the construction of Japan's first gas-lighting system in the streets of Nihonbashi, Ginza and Yokohama.
 1872: Paul Brunat opens the first modern Japanese silk spinning factory at Tomioka. Three craftsmen from the Nishijin weaving district in Kyoto travel to Lyon. They travel back to Japan in 1873, importing a Jacquard loom.
 1872: Start of the second French Military Mission to Japan (1872-1880).
 1873: The legal expert Gustave Emile Boissonade arrives in Japan to help build a modern legal system.
 1874: The Second French Military Mission is sent to Japan, and builds the military school of Ichigaya, the start of the Imperial Japanese Army Academy.
 1882: The first tramways are introduced from France and start functioning at Asakusa, and between Shinbashi and Ueno.
 1884: Third French Military Mission to Japan (1884-1889).
 1886: The French naval engineer Emile Bertin starts a four years' stay in Japan to advise the government on how to reinforce the Imperial Japanese Navy with new modern ships, and directs the expansion and modernization of the Yokosuka Naval Arsenal and the design and initial construction of the new arsenals of Kure and Sasebo, thereby contributing to the Japanese victory in the Russo-Japanese War in 1905. He was special adviser to Emperor Mutsuhito for naval development and was awarded by the Japanese government with the titles of Takaku Yaku nin et Chokunin.

 1898: The first automobile (a Panhard-Levassor) is introduced in Japan.

20th century
 1907: Signing of the Franco-Japanese Treaty of 1907. France took the lead in creating alliances with Japan, Russia and (informally) with Britain. Japan wanted to raise a loan in Paris, so France made the loan contingent on a Russo-Japanese agreement and a Japanese guaranty for France's strategically vulnerable possessions in Indochina. Britain encouraged the Russo-Japanese rapprochement. Thus was built the Triple Entente coalition that fought World War I.
 1909: The first Japanese mechanical flight, a biplane glider tractored by an automobile, occurs in Ueno through the collaboration of Shiro Aihara and Le Prieur at a French military attaché in Tokyo.
 1910: Captain Tokugawa Yoshitoshi, trained in France as a pilot, makes the first self-propelled flight on board a Henri Farman plane.
 1910: Sakichi Toyoda, founder of the Toyota Corporation, visits France to study spinning techniques.
 1918: Fourth French Military Mission to Japan (1918–1919)
 1919: France supported Japanese racial equality proposal in Paris Peace Conference.
 1924: First air flight from France to Japan, by Pelletier Doisy and Besin.
 1925: First air flight from Japan to France, by Kawauchi and Abe.
 1927: French-Japanese agreement grants most favoured nations treatment to Japanese in French Indochina and to Indochinese subjects in Japan.
 1940: Start of the Japanese invasion of French Indochina.
 1941: Japan pressures the Vichy France into making important military concessions in French Indochina, but leaves the French army and administration intact.
 1943: Guangzhouwan, a small French enclave on the southern coast of China, is occupied by the Japanese.
 1945: Japanese coup d'état in French Indochina—Japanese troops rapidly attack and take full control of French Indochina, which Japan maintains until its defeat several months later in September 1945.
 1946–1950: Japanese war criminals are tried in Saigon for their action in Indochina during the war.
 1952: First Air France flight to Japan.
 1997: "Year of Japan in France" and the opening of a Japanese cultural centre in Paris.
 1998: "Year of France in Japan" in which 400 events took place across Japan to celebrate France and its people.

Franco-Japanese relations today

In June 1996, in Lyon, as part of the G7 summit which took place thanks to the crucial role played by the Consul General of Japan, Louis Michallet, Ryutaro Hashimoto and Jacques Chirac decided to organize "The Year of Japan in France", from April 1997 to March 1998 in order to correct the superficial and sometimes inaccurate understanding of Japanese culture. The start of that year coincided with the inauguration of the House of Culture of Japan in Paris. "The Year of France in Japan" followed "the Year of Japan", the combination of these two events inaugurating Franco-Japanese relations for the 21st century.

The two countries have been collaborating closely in the area of nuclear energy generation. In September 2013, two years after the nuclear disaster at Fukushima, Japan has officially accepted help from France for the decommission and dismantle of Fukushima's reactors. Mitsubishi Heavy Industries, a Japanese corporation and France's Areva began cooperating on constructing a nuclear reactor in Turkey in 2013.

In June 2005, France and Japan announced a collaboration to build the next generation supersonic commercial aircraft, a successor to the Concorde. Commercial service is not expected until 2050.

Laurent Fabius, French Foreign Minister, met with Japanese Prime Minister Shinzo Abe as a courtesy call during a visit to Japan from 5 October to 6 October 2014. The meeting included Abe expressing his condolences for the ISIL beheading of French backpacker Hervé Gourdel and both agreed on future meetings on defense cooperation and tackling global warming.

Today many parts of Japanese pop culture such as manga and anime have become very popular among French people.

French in Japan

 Pierre Barouh, songwriter and composer, singer
 Louis-Émile Bertin, naval engineer in Japan from 1886 to 1890
 Siegfried Bing, an art collector and dealer who pioneered Japonism
 Gustave Emile Boissonade in Japan from 1873 to 1895
 Nicolas Bouvier, Swiss francophone writer
 Jules Brunet, military officer
 Paul Claudel, French ambassador in Tokyo from 1922 to 1928
 Julie Dreyfus, actress
 Claude Farrère, writer
 Michael Ferrier, writer in Japan since 1992
 Émile Étienne Guimet, industrialist and art collector
 Pierre Loti, writer
 Bernard Petitjean, Roman Catholic priest who served as a missionary to Japan and became the country's first vicar apostolic. 
 Maurice Pinguet, writer in Japan from 1958 to 1968 and from 1979 to 1989
 Félix Régamey, painter, draftsman and cartoonist
 Léon Roches, diplomat
 Léonce Verny, naval engineer in Japan from 1865 to 1876

Japanese in France
 Hasekura Tsunenaga
 Fukuzawa Yukichi as a translator in the 1862 mission
 Shibata Takenaka (1823–1878)
 Tsuguharu Foujita (in France from 1913 to 1931)
 Tetsumi Kudo
 Kenzo Takada

See also
 Foreign cemeteries in Japan
 Foreign relations of Japan
 France–Asia relations
 Japonism
 Manga outside Japan#France and Manfra 
 o-yatoi gaikokujin - foreign employees in Meiji era Japan
 Paris syndrome

References

Further reading

In English 
 Aminian, Nathalie, and K. C. Fung. "Silicon Valley, Japan and France: A Comparative Study of Innovation Systems and Policies" (2019). online
 Edwards, Ewen W. "The Far Eastern Agreements of 1907". Journal of Modern History 26.4 (1954): 340–355. online
 Ferrier, Michaël. "France-Japan: The Coral Writers (From stereotype to prototype, in favor of rethinking a critical approach to Japan)". Contemporary French and Francophone Studies 21.1 (2017): 8-27.
 Hokenson, Jan Walsh. Japan, France & East-West Aesthetics: French Literature, 1867-2000 (2004),  520pp.
 Jones, Christopher S. "A Lost Tradition: Nishida Kitarō, Henri Bergson and Intuition in Political Philosophy". Social Science Japan Journal 5.1 (2002): 55–70. 
 Lederman, Leonard L. "A comparative analysis of civilian technology strategies among some nations: France, the Federal Republic of Germany, Japan, the United Kingdom, and the United States". Policy Studies Journal 22.2 (1994): 279–295.
 Lehmann, Jean-Pierre. "France, Japan, Europe, and industrial competition: the automotive case". International Affairs 68.1 (1992): 37–53.
 Locke, Robert R. Management & Higher Education since 1940: The Influence of America & Japan on West Germany, Great Britain & France (1989),  328pp.
  Put, Max. Plunder & Pleasure: Japanese Art in the West, 1860-1930 (2000), 151pp covers 1860 to 1930.
  Silberman, Bernard S. Cages of Reason: The Rise of the Rational State in France, Japan, the United States & Great Britain (1993) 487pp; covers 20th century
 Slaymaker, Doug. Confluences: Postwar Japan & France. 2002 185 pp. covers 1945 to 1999. 
 White, John Albert. Transition to Global Rivalry: Alliance Diplomacy & the Quadruple Entente, 1895-1907 (1995) 344 pp. re France, Japan, Russia, Britain

Other languages
 Maurice Pinguet, Le Texte Japon, introuvables et inédits, Seuil, 2009.
 Polak, Christian. (2001). Soie et lumières: L'âge d'or des échanges franco-japonais (des origines aux années 1950). Tokyo: Chambre de Commerce et d'Industrie Française du Japon, Hachette Fujin Gahōsha (アシェット婦人画報社).
 Polak, Christian. (2002). 絹と光: 知られざる日仏交流100年の歴史 (江戶時代-1950年代) Kinu to hikariō: shirarezaru Nichi-Futsu kōryū 100-nen no rekishi (Edo jidai-1950-nendai). Tokyo: Ashetto Fujin Gahōsha, 2002. ; 
 Michael Ferrier, La Tentation de la France, la Tentation du Japon : regards croisés, éd. Picquier, 2003 
 Michael Ferrier, Japon, la Barrière des Rencontres, éd. Cécile Defaut, 2009

External links
 Japan-France Relations
 Niten Ichi Ryu Memorial

 
France
Japan
History of the foreign relations of Japan